The 1969 Canadian Ladies Curling Association Championship the Canadian women's curling championship was held from February 24 to 27, 1969 at the Fort William Curling and Athletic Club in Fort William, Ontario.

Team Saskatchewan, who was skipped by Joyce McKee won the event by finishing the round robin with a 8-1 record.

This was the second time that the championship came down to a "winner take all" final draw (the first was in ) as both Ontario and Saskatchewan entered their matchup in with identical 7–1 records in round robin play. Ontario jumped out to a 4–1 lead after four ends, but Saskatchewan rallied with singles in four straight ends to take a 5–4 lead after eight ends. A single by Ontario in the ninth tied things up at 5 heading into the final end. Saskatchewan, with hammer in the final end scored one to clinch the championship by a 6–5 score.

The Quebec rink became the second team ever to finish round robin play winless joining the  rink.

The tournament set a then record for most extra end games in one tournament with eight.

Teams
The teams are listed as follows:

Round robin standings
Final Round Robin standings

Round robin results
All draw times are listed in Eastern Standard Time (UTC-05:00).

Draw 1 
Monday, February 24, 2:30 pm

Draw 2 
Monday, February 24, 8:00 pm

Draw 3 
Tuesday, February 25, 9:30 am

Draw 4 
Tuesday, February 25, 8:00 pm

Draw 5 
Wednesday, February 26, 9:30 am

Draw 6 
Wednesday, February 26, 2:30 pm

Draw 7 
Wednesday, February 26, 8:00 pm

Draw 8 
Thursday, February 27, 9:30 am

Draw 9 
Thursday, February 27, 8:00 pm

References

Canadian Ladies Curling Association Championship, 1969
Scotties Tournament of Hearts
Sports competitions in Thunder Bay
Curling in Northern Ontario
Canadian Ladies Curling Association Championship
Canadian Ladies Curling Association Championship
Canadian Ladies Curling Association Championship
Canadian Ladies Curling Association Championship